The 2009 Dahsyatnya Awards was an awards show for Indonesian musicians. It was the first annual show. The show was held on April 19, 2009, at the Ancol Dome Carnaval Beach in Pademangan, North Jakarta. The awards show was hosted by Luna Maya, Raffi Ahmad, and Olga Syahputra.

D'Masiv and Nidji led the nominations with four categories, followed by Peterpan, Project Pop and The Changcuters with three nominations. Peterpan was the biggest winner of the night, taking home two awards for Outstanding Band and Outstanding Video Clip for "Walau Habis Terang".

Winners and nominees
Winners are listed first and highlighted on boldface.

SMS

Jury

References

2009 music awards
Dahsyatnya Awards
Indonesian music awards